Jeffrey Field is an outdoor college soccer stadium in University Park, Pennsylvania, United States, on the campus of Pennsylvania State University. It has been home to Penn State Nittany Lions men's soccer and Penn State Nittany Lions women's soccer since 1972. The stadium was dedicated and named after the late-Bill Jeffrey, who was Penn State men's soccer head coach from 1926 until 1952. Jeffrey Field had an initial seating capacity of 2,500, but was later increased to 3,000 in 1978. The stadium's capacity was increased again in 2003 to meet rising ticket needs.

History
Jeffrey Field hosted its first match on September 29, 1972 when Penn State men's soccer faced George Washington University in a pre-season match. 5,000 spectators were in attendance, exceeding the 2,000 person opening capacity of Jeffrey Field by nearly 3,000 spectators. Without seats as fans lined the sides of the field three or more spectators deep to watch the match. This opening game marked the first Penn State athletic event to ever be played at night under stadium floodlights. An opening ceremony was held before the match where the field was dedicated to the former Penn State men’s soccer head Bill Jeffrey, renaming the grounds from East Halls Soccer Fields to Jeffrey Field. The inaugural match ended in an 8-1 victory for the Nittany Lions.

Jeffrey Field was first remodeled in 1978, bleachers were added to expand the capacity to 3,500 along with fencing and a practice field. In 1996 the lights were updated prior to the season start. During the summer of 2003, Jeffrey Field again underwent a facelift. In addition to the installation of a new field surface, a press box and a video booth were also added, and the bleachers were expanded to a capacity of 5,000. Team locker rooms were added in 2013, and in August 2014 branding windscreens were installed.

Jeffrey Field received an upgrade to its practice facility in 2007 when the University replaced the stadium’s practice fields. The project constructed two new fenced practice fields adjacent to Jeffrey Field and Beaver Stadium where the former Penn State baseball field had been located. The project cost the Penn State Athletic department $2.9 million and were opened for use on September 1, 2008.

Jeffrey Field was honored in 2006 as the Collegiate Soccer Field of the Year by the SportsTurf Managers Association.

Beginning in the spring of 2010 a renovation of the playing surface took place after a contamination of poa annua was found in the turf. The field surface was changed from Kentucky Bluegrass to Perennial Ryegrass to match the most common grass used in pitches across Europe.

Jeffrey Field will host the semifinals and final of the 2020 Big Ten Women's Soccer Tournament.

Future
Penn State released their 20-year plan to improve athletic facilities in 2017. Jeffrey Field was included in the renovation plans featuring a new home and visiting locker facilities, covered seating via overhang on the west side of the stadium, renovated restrooms and concessions, a videoboard, lighting around the complex and media facilities. Jeffrey Field’s capacity, will be about 4,000 after completion which will a downsize from the current 5000 person capacity.

Supporters

The Park Avenue Army is a supporters group for Penn State men's soccer and Penn State women's soccer. The Park Avenue Army was founded as a Supporters' groups for Penn State Nittany Lions women's soccer team in 2011. The group was named after Park Avenue the street at which Jeffrey Field is located. Members of the group occupy the northwest stand of Jeffrey Field during home matches.

References 

Soccer venues in Pennsylvania
Penn State Nittany Lions men's soccer
Penn State Nittany Lions women's soccer
Pennsylvania State University
Penn State Nittany Lions
Pennsylvania State University campus